Traveller Supplement Adventure 9: Nomads of the World-Ocean is a 1983 role-playing game adventure for Traveller, written by J. Andrew Keith and William H. Keith, Jr., published by Game Designers' Workshop. Nomads of the World-Ocean deals with attempts to gather evidence of corporate wrongdoing on an ocean-covered world.

Plot summary
Nomads of the World-Ocean is an adventure that concerns an investigation by a group of adventurers into the alleged illegal slaughter by a subsidiary of an omnipotent megacorporation, of huge sea beasts of a waterworld.

Reception
William A. Barton reviewed Nomads of the World-Ocean in Space Gamer No. 65. Barton commented that "Overall, if you don't mind the duplication of theme from the earlier work, Nomads could be a worthwhile buy if you're interested in a waterworld and don't have the time or inclination to work it out on your own, or are simply interested in the possibilities of sea hunts with hunterfoil-type vessels."

Andy Slack reviewed Adventure 9: Nomads of the World-Ocean for White Dwarf #49, giving it an overall rating of 9 out of 10, and stated that "If the adventurers can be properly guided into the scenario, it is superb stuff and will last up to a game year or so. The Brothers Keith have their faults, but they can make a world live like no-one else."

Jim Bambra reviewed Adventure 9 – Nomads of the World Ocean for Imagine magazine, and stated that "Nomads is an excellent piece of work: it has intrigue, action, role-playing and a wealth of background. This world has been well developed; there is none of the sketchiness common to many Traveller worlds."

Reviews
 Different Worlds #33 (March/April, 1984)

References

Role-playing game supplements introduced in 1983
Traveller (role-playing game) adventures